William Gerard (aft. 1520–1584) was an  English Member of Parliament for the constituencies of Preston and Wigan during the reigns of Mary I and Elizabeth I of England.

Biography
Gerard was born after 1520. He was the son of James Gerard of Astley and Ince, Lancashire and Margaret, daughter of John Holcroft; and brother of Sir Gilbert Gerard of Ince.

By 1552 Gerard had been appointed Receiver of the Middlesex lands of the Edward, Lord North by 1552. He was return as a member of four parliaments: Preston October 1553 (1st Parliament of Mary I); Wigan 1559 (1st Elizabeth); Wigan 1563 (2nd Elizabeth); and Wigan, 1571 (3rd Elizabeth). He was Feodary for Middlesex in 1565. He was appointed a governor of Harrow School in 1572. From March until December 1578 he was escheator in Kent and Middlesex, and from around 1583 he was a Justice of the Peace in Middlesex. He died on 19 September 1584.

Family
Gerard married Dorothy, daughter of Thomas Page of Sudbury Court, Middlesex. They had eight sons including William Gerard (c. 1551–1609) and four daughters.

Notes

References

1520 births
1584 deaths